William Spencer (born 1914), nicknamed "Pee Wee", was an American Negro league third baseman who played in 1939 and 1940.

A native of Mississippi, Spencer made his Negro leagues debut in 1939 with the Toledo Crawfords, and remained with the team the following season as it moved to Indianapolis.

References

External links
 and Seamheads

1914 births
Date of birth missing
Place of birth missing
Year of death missing
Toledo Crawfords players
Baseball third basemen
Baseball players from Mississippi